New York and Greenwood Lake Railway may refer to:
New York and Greenwood Lake Railway (1878–1943), a predecessor of the Erie Railroad in New Jersey
New York and Greenwood Lake Railway (1996), an unrelated shortline railroad in Garfield and Passaic, New Jersey